is a Buddhist temple near Mount Atago in Ukyō-ku, Kyoto, Japan. The temple was first founded in 781, it is associated with the Shugendō practices of Kūya and Hōnen. Its treasures include eight Heian period statues. Images of Amida Nyorai and Kūya chanting the nembutsu are amongst those designated Important Cultural Properties.

See also
 List of Buddhist temples in Kyoto
 Atago Jinja

References

External links
 Photographs of Gatsurinji and its statues

Buddhist temples in Kyoto Prefecture
Tendai temples
Shinran
Hōnen